Alumni of Oakham School are known as Old Oakhamians.

Oakham School is a British co-educational independent school in the market town of Oakham in Rutland, with a school roll of about 1,000 pupils, aged from 10 to 18. The school was founded in 1584 by archdeacon Robert Johnson, along with Uppingham School, a few miles away.

Notable former pupils include:

Academics 

 Joseph George Cumming, geologist and archaeologist, professor of classical literature and geology
 Horace Donisthorpe, entomologist, myrmecologist and coleopterist
 Peter North, principal of Jesus College and Vice-Chancellor of Oxford
 John Henry Pratt, mathematician
 Sir Michael Stoker, virologist and cancer biologist

Armed forces 

 Rear Admiral Philip Wilcocks

Ecclesiastics 

 James Atlay, 98th Bishop of Hereford
 John Godfrey FitzMaurice Day, Bishop of Ossory, Ferns and Leighlin (1920-1938); Archbishop of Armagh (1938)
 Francis ffolkes, 5th Baronet, Chaplain-in-Ordinary to King George V (1910–1936)
 Leonard Hawkes, Archdeacon of Lindisfarne
 John Henley, clergyman, commonly known as 'Orator Henley'
 Thomas Merton, writer and Trappist monk

Politics, the Colonial Service and the law 

 Anthony Clarke, Baron Clarke of Stone-cum-Ebony, Justice of the Supreme Court of the United Kingdom
 Lord Cope of Berkeley, Conservative Member of Parliament for South Gloucestershire 1974-1983; Northavon 1983-1997; during this time he was Paymaster-General 1992-1994 
 Paul Filing, Australian politician (Member of the House of Representatives for Moore, Western Australia)
William Allmond Codrington Goode , last Governor of Singapore 1957-1959; last Governor of North Borneo 1959-1963
 William George "Bill" O'Chee, Australian politician (Senator for Queensland)
 Kate Harrisson, British Ambassador to Peru (2018-present)

Arts

 Charlie Bewley, actor
 Lydia Rose Bewley, actor 
 Henry Camamile, Rory Young, Andrew Dawson, and Oli Khan of Sea Girls, indie rock band from London
 Katie Hall, actress and soprano
 Andy Harries, UK producer, Left Bank Pictures
 Greg Hicks, actor
 Richard Hope, actor
 Richard Hurst, writer and director
 Daniel Hyde, organist and conductor
 Miles Jupp, actor, comedian
 Jason Kay, singer (Jamiroquai)
 Matthew Macfadyen, actor
 Matthew Manning, psychic
 China Miéville, novelist
 Katie Mitchell, theatre director
 Alexander Newley, painter
 Alfred Young Nutt, Victorian artist and architect
 Malcolm Rogers, director of the Museum of Fine Arts, Boston, Massachusetts
 Kwame Ryan, conductor and musician
 Janek Schaefer, sound artist, British Composer of the Year in Sonic Art
 Indra Sinha, novelist
 Tom Wiggall, composer

Broadcasting and media 

Tom Heap, BBC News rural affairs correspondent (formerly BBC News's science and environment correspondent)
Charlotte Uhlenbroek, biologist and broadcaster

Sports 

 Charlie Beech, professional rugby union player with Bath Rugby and England U19s
 Matthew Boyce, cricketer (Leicestershire)
 Roderick Bradley, player of American football
 J.W.M. Bradshaw, cricketer (Leicestershire)
 Stuart Broad, England international cricketer cricketer and England T20 captain
 Alex Brundle, professional racing driver
 Percy Chapman, England cricketer (captain)
 Josh Cobb, cricketer (Leicestershire)
 Rob Cook, rugby union player for Gloucester Rugby
 Tom Croft, British and Irish Lions and England player
 Crista Cullen, England and Great Britain field hockey player
 Arthur Cursham, England footballer and county cricketer (Nottinghamshire and Derbyshire)
 John Furley, cricketer
 Alex Goode, rugby union player for Saracens RFC and England Saxons
 Ron Jacobs, rugby union player, England International and captain
 Lyndon James, cricketer
 Frank Jerwood, Olympic oarsman
 Joseph Kendall, cricketer
 Alex Martin, cricketer
 Bhargav Modha, cricketer
 Lewis Moody, British and Irish Lions, England Rugby, Leicester Tigers and Bath Rugby rugby union player; England captain
 Lucy Pearson, England women's cricket captain
 Matt Smith, rugby union player, England Saxons
 James Alexander Simpson Taylor, cricketer (Leicestershire and Scotland)
 Hamish Watson, rugby union player for Edinburgh and Scotland
 Alex Wyatt, cricketer (Leicestershire)
 Tom Fell, cricketer

Others 

 John Jerwood, founder of the Jerwood Foundation
 Thomas Merton, writer and religious figure
 Richard Profit, polar explorer

References

Oakham
Old Oakham